Police intelligence refers to an element of the British police. Staffed by police officers and support staff, its purpose is to track and predict crime with a view to curbing it. It is an emerging field that gained momentum after the National Criminal Intelligence Service (NCIS) launched the National Intelligence Model, which formalised the contribution intelligence makes to policing. There are also intelligence units at divisional level (DIU).

Function 

The Intelligence analysts investigate who is committing crimes, how, when, where and why. They then provide recommendations on how to stop or curb the offences. As part of this, analysts produce profiles of crime problems and individual subjects, and produce both strategic (overall, long-term) and tactical (specific, short-term) assessments within the confines set by the individual police force. These assessments and profiles are used to both monitor and predict crime, aiming to move policing from "reactionary" investigation to "proactive" investigation. Analysts look for links between a wide variety of intelligence sources to work out what is going on, and make recommendations on how to stop it. This is done at all levels, from local police stations dealing with town issues, to whole county crime, regional crime and beyond.

Personnel 

At the heart of police intelligence is the intelligence analyst. Analysts are drawn from diverse backgrounds; some are graduates from any academic background and some are retired police officers. Most have experience working in an analytical field. They are recruited on a per-vacancy basis directly by the police force that will employ them, not through any national scheme. Analysts work very closely with regular police officers on particular areas of crime; an analyst might work with a police officer on a vehicle crime desk, or a violent crime desk, for example. Opportunities exist for progression within the profession; while individual forces differ, an analyst can become a lead analyst, senior analyst or principal analyst. Opportunities are likely to exist for analysts to work on a national level with the Serious Organised Crime Agency, now the National Crime Agency.

Tools 

Analysts have a huge, even endless, variety of sources to work from. These include the UK National DNA Database, Police National Computer, crimint, crime reports and information from witnesses, information from informants and agents, local knowledge, surveillance logs, force intelligence summaries and even newspaper reports. Intelligence Units have staff whose job is to build up and develop intelligence (such as the police officers mentioned above), and analysts are expected to make sense of this information and identify gaps for intelligence-gathering officers to fill.

Analysts have a number of IT systems to help make sense of the information, including i2, bespoke police information management systems, geographical mapping tools and social mapping tools. They often work closely and exchange information with other law enforcement agencies, including the Serious Organised Crime Agency, other police forces and MI5.

See also
 British Police
 Forward Intelligence Team
 Intelligence-led policing
 MI5
 Serious Organised Crime Agency

References

External links
 International Association of Law Enforcement Intelligence Analysts
 Intelligence led Policing
 Resources and the People assets of the National Intelligence Model
 Profile of an Analyst Working for Sussex Police

Law enforcement in the United Kingdom
Intelligence gathering disciplines